{{DISPLAYTITLE:C/2006 VZ13 (LINEAR)}}

Comet C/ (LINEAR) (also written C/2006 VZ13), is a non-periodic comet discovered November 13, 2006 by the LINEAR.

The object was initially believed to be a minor planet due to its stellar appearance in the early images. However, observers soon detected a small coma and the telltale green cometary cast.

The comet peaked at approximately magnitude +7.5, much brighter than predicted. The comet made Earth approach on July 14, 2007 at a distance of 0.575 AU. Perihelion was August 10, 2007 at a distance of 1.015 AU.

Additional Images

See also 
 List of comets credited to LINEAR

References and footnotes

External links 
 Comet's trail to August 3
 - Comet LINEAR Graces The Northern Sky
 - Seiichi Yoshida's C/ page

Non-periodic comets